SNU Stadium located in Bethany, Oklahoma is the home stadium of the NCAA Division II college football team the Crimson Storm of Southern Nazarene University.

SNU played their inaugural season at Taft Stadium in Oklahoma City. SNU Stadium opened on November 3, 2001. The next season SNU installed a press box. During this time SNU was a member of the National Association of Intercollegiate Athletics. In 2012, the program moved to NCAA Division II and became a member of the Great American Conference.

The stadium is also home to the Bethany High School Bronchos.

References

College football venues
Southern Nazarene Crimson Storm football
Buildings and structures in Canadian County, Oklahoma
American football venues in Oklahoma
2001 establishments in Oklahoma
Sports venues completed in 2001
High school football venues in the United States